Theodore Edward Dowling (1837 – 1921), Archdeacon in Syria, was an Anglican Priest and historian, who studied the ancient oriental churches and made numerous scholarly publications of books regarding the church history of Armenia, Antioch, Eastern Orthodox Patriarchate of Jerusalem and Georgia.

Some of Archdeacon Dowling's numerous works which are of special value
1909: The Patriarchate of Jerusalem, Alexander Radischev, 1749-1802 (London)
1911: The Armenian Church, London: Society for Promoting Christian Knowledge; New York: E. S. Gorham, 1910.
1911: Sketches of Georgian Church History (London: Elibron Classics series, first published by SPCK in 1912 and re-published in 2003)
1913: The Orthodox Greek Patriarchate of Jerusalem; 3rd ed. London: SPCK

See also
Kartvelian studies

External links
Dowling, Theodore Edward (1837-1921) Archdeacon in Syria; National Archives
Theodore Edward Dowling; The Online Books Page

1837 births
1921 deaths
British historians
Historians of Georgia (country)
Historians of Armenia
Episcopal Church in Jerusalem and the Middle East archdeacons